Broken House Chronicles is a Canadian television series which premiered in 2001 on HGTV (Canada) and was produced by Mountain Road Productions. 

This 32-episode series chronicled a first-time homeowner named George Brook and his roommate Leigh Uttley as these two men tackled do-it-yourself (DIY) projects.  After its original appearance on HGTV, this show returned to television on the DIY Channel.

Awards

|-
| 2004
| Broken House Chronicles
| Gemini Award, Category: Best Host in a Lifestyle/Practical Information, or Performing Arts Program or Series – George Brook
|  
|-
| 2004
| Broken House Chronicles
| Gemini Award, Category: Best Host in a Lifestyle/Practical Information, or Performing Arts Program or Series – Ryley Alp
|  
|-
| 2004
| Broken House Chronicles
| Gemini Award, Category: Best Host in a Lifestyle/Practical Information, or Performing Arts Program or Series – Leigh Utley
|  
|-
| 2002
| Broken House Chronicles
| Gemini Award, Category: Best Practical Information Series
|  
|}

International Syndication

External links 
 “Broken House” (show info)
 “Mountain House Productions: Broken House Chronicles”

References

2001 Canadian television series debuts
2000s Canadian reality television series